Josef Tomáš can refer to:

 Josef Tomáš (runner) (born 1934), Czech long-distance runner
 Josef Tomáš (weightlifter) (born 1898), Czech weightlifter